Neighborhood watch is a citizens' organization devoted to crime prevention within a neighborhood.

Neighborhood or Neighbourhood watch may also refer to:

 National Neighborhood Watch Program, a United States neighborhood watch program run under Citizen Corps
 National Night Out, a community-police awareness-raising event in the United States
 Neighbourhood Watch (United Kingdom), a community crime-prevention partnership in the United Kingdom
 Neighborhood Watch (album), a 2004 album by Dilated Peoples, or the title track
 "Neighbourhood Watch" (short story), a 1987 short story by Greg Egan
 "Neighborhood Watch" (Law & Order: Criminal Intent), an episode of Law & Order: Criminal Intent
 Dame Edna's Neighbourhood Watch, a 1992 comedy game show
 Neighborhood Watch (2005 film), a film starring Terry Becker 
 The Watch (2012 film) (previously titled Neighborhood Watch), a film directed by Akiva Schaffer
 The Neighborhood Watch, a 2014 American short film by Christopher Langer
 Neighbourhood Watch (Ayckbourn play), a 2011 play written by Alan Ayckbourn
 Neighbourhood Watch (Katz play), a 2011 play written by Lally Katz
 "Neighborhood Watch" (White Collar), an episode of the American comedy-drama television series White Collar
 "Neighbourhood Watch", a 2018 song by English rapper Skepta